Chairil Anwar Abdul Aziz (born 7 April 1972) is a Malaysian field hockey player. He competed in the 1996 and 2000 Summer Olympics.

References

External links

1972 births
Living people
Field hockey players at the 1996 Summer Olympics
Field hockey players at the 2000 Summer Olympics
1998 Men's Hockey World Cup players
Malaysian male field hockey players
Olympic field hockey players of Malaysia
Asian Games medalists in field hockey
Field hockey players at the 2002 Asian Games
Asian Games bronze medalists for Malaysia
Medalists at the 2002 Asian Games
Field hockey players at the 1998 Commonwealth Games
Commonwealth Games medallists in field hockey
Commonwealth Games silver medallists for Malaysia
Medallists at the 1998 Commonwealth Games